is a Japanese women's professional shogi player ranked 1-dan.

Early life and amateur shogi

Promotion history
Uchiyama's promotion history is as follows:

 2-kyū: December 1, 1020
 1-kyū: April 1, 2022
 1-dan: March 9, 2023

Note: All ranks are women's professional ranks.

References

External links
 ShogiHub: Uchiyama, Aya
 Aya Uchiyama's Supporters Club 
 October 2020 Koma.doc blog interview 

2004 births
Living people
Sportspeople from Belfast
Japanese shogi players
Women's professional shogi players
Professional shogi players born outside of Japan